Qavolqa (also Romanized as Qāvolqā) is a village in Jargalan Rural District, Raz and Jargalan District, Bojnord County, North Khorasan Province, Iran. At the 2006 census, its population was 478, in 116 families.

References 

Populated places in Bojnord County